Jumpy may refer to:

Citroën Jumpy, vehicle made at Sevel Nord
Jumpy Geathers (born 1960), American football player
Jumpy (play), 2011 play by April De Angelis
In electronics, one uses a jumper cable or jumpy (slang) to connect things.

See also

Jump (disambiguation)